n-Space Inc. was an American video game developer founded in 1994 by Erick S. Dyke, Dan O'Leary, and Sean Purcell. It developed games on nearly a dozen different platforms, but was mostly focused on Nintendo consoles and handhelds in particular since 2001. The game Geist was a second-party project, developed in cooperation with Nintendo. In March 2016, it was announced that n-Space had closed down.

History
n-Space founders Erick S. Dyke and Sean Purcell met while working at General Electric Aerospace (now part of Lockheed Martin) to create advanced military simulators. In 1991, GE Aerospace began to explore the possibility of using its 3D technology for commercial applications. This led to a series of contracts with Sega for the development of the Model 1 and Model 2 arcade boards. Dyke, O’Leary, and Purcell spent two months working with Sega in Japan to complete the development of one of the first Model 2 arcade titles, Desert Tank. The trio worked with director Hiroshi Kataoka and the head of the Sega AM2 division, Yu Suzuki. In 1994, Dyke, O’Leary, and Purcell founded n-Space with funding from Sony Computer Entertainment of America to develop games on the newly launched Sony PlayStation console. n-Space launched their first video game in 1997 for PlayStation, Tiger Shark.

In 2011, n-Space announced their largest project yet: developing an all-new property from the ground-up, made exclusively for the Nintendo 3DS in cooperation with Square Enix. This property is Heroes of Ruin and was launched in June 2012. In 2015, n-Space released their first independent title, Sword Coast Legends, with Digital Extremes. The game is a role-playing video game set within the Dungeons & Dragons universe. On March 29, 2016, it was announced that n-Space had closed down, 22 years after its founding.

Games developed

Cancelled projects

External links

References

Video game development companies
Video game companies established in 1994
Video game companies disestablished in 2016
Defunct video game companies of the United States
Defunct companies based in Florida
1994 establishments in Florida
2016 disestablishments in Florida